The 2006 Paris–Roubaix was the 104th running of the Paris–Roubaix single-day cycling race, often known as the Hell of the North. Fabian Cancellara became the second road racing cyclist from Switzerland to win the race. This edition was run under clear skies and relatively good weather, meaning that the difficulty of this edition was the dust. The main favourite for the race was Tom Boonen, winner of the 2005 Paris–Roubaix and the 2006 Tour of Flanders.

First selection

As usual, the selection of favourites was done at the Forest of Arenberg after Cancellara and Tom Boonen increased the pace. The selection included 17 riders, consisting of:
 for : Peter Van Petegem and Gert Steegmans
 for : Vladimir Gusev, George Hincapie and Leif Hoste
 for : Tom Boonen
 for : Steffen Wesemann and Stephan Schreck
 for : Frédéric Guesdon and Bernhard Eisel
 for : Juan Antonio Flecha and Joost Posthuma
 for : Nicolas Portal
 for : Alessandro Ballan and Enrico Franzoi
 for : Fabian Cancellara and Lars Michaelsen

Key moments

Most of the riders began to quicken the pace after they realized that Tom Boonen, previous year winner and main favourite, had no teammates in the leading group. A persecution began between the leading group and a peloton led by five  riders, including Filippo Pozzato and Servais Knaven, trying to assist Tom Boonen. With 80 kilometers to go and after almost 20 kilometers of struggling,  gave up. In the leading group Joost Posthuma, Enrico Franzoi, Nicolas Portal and Stephan Schreck lost contact with the leading group although Portal would eventually rejoin the lead.

With 45 kilometres to go, while going through Mons-en-Pévèle cobblestone section, George Hincapie's steerer tube broke and he injured his collarbone, forcing him to retire from the race. Soon after Tom Boonen and Juan Antonio Flecha made a series of accelerations that selected the lead group to only eight riders: Alessandro Ballan, Tom Boonen, Fabian Cancellara, Bernhard Eisel, Juan Antonio Flecha, Vladimir Gusev, Leif Hoste and Peter Van Petegem. Vladimir Gusev fell a short time later in a fall that also brought down the Italian Alessandro Ballan with 25 kilometres to go, although they could make it back to the lead.

With 20 kilometres to go and riding through Camphin-en Pévèle cobblestones sector, Fabian Cancellara attacked and gained a few metres along with Vladimir Gusev over the rest of the leaders. The difference soon increased to 20 seconds when, hitting Carrefour de l'Arbre, Cancellara began a solo effort to Roubaix after Gusev couldn't hold on the pace by the Swiss time-trial specialist. In this same sector Leif Hoste attacked while Gusev was losing contact with Cancellara. Peter Van Petegem followed him, while Tom Boonen, Juan Antonio Flecha and Alessandro Ballan were close behind them. Hoste and Van Petegem would eventually catch Gusev trying to catch Cancellara, who wouldn't stop increasing his advantage, eventually winning over a minute in Roubaix Velodrome.

Disqualifications
Hoste, Van Petegem and Vladimir Gusev were initially credited with 2nd through 4th places (1'23" down), but were later disqualified by the race jury for illegally riding through a closed level-crossing. (This railway crossing should not have been closed and the organizers received criticism because of it.) This promoted world champion and pre-race favourite Boonen into 2nd place.

Results

09-04-2006: Compiègne–Roubaix, 259 km.:

References

External links
Live race website
Race map

Paris–Roubaix
Paris-Roubaix
Paris-Roubaix
Paris-Roubaix